CISM-FM is the official campus radio station of the Université de Montréal. It is run by student volunteers and can be heard in Montreal and its outlying regions at 89.3 FM or by Internet users around the world through online streaming. CISM broadcasts in French.

As early as 1970, Université de Montréal students developed the idea of a French college radio station. In 1980, a requested feasibility study gave place to recommendations for a potential radio broadcasting school. At noon on October 7, 1985, CISM broadcast its first radio show over the university's campus. In July 1990, CISM gained its FM broadcast permit from the Canadian Radio-television and Telecommunications Commission (CRTC). Then, on March 14, 1991, CISM's broadcasting antenna (located atop Mount Royal) was boosted to 10,000 watts. With a broadcasting radius of 70 km (40 miles), CISM is now the world's largest French-language college radio station.

The station also broadcasts a Tamil language radio format on a subsidiary communications multiplex operation frequency, branded as International Tamil Radio (ITR-FM).  ITR-FM has recently been granted approval for a 50-watt station on FM 102.9 in the Ahuntsic neighbourhood.

References

External links
  
 
 

Ism
Université de Montréal
Ism
Ism
Radio stations established in 1991
1991 establishments in Quebec